Ivo (Yves) de Bellême ( unknown , c.1071), was simultaneously bishop of Sées and lord of  Bellême from c.1047/8 to c.1071.  He was the son of William of Bellême and brother of  William I Talvas. 

Yves inherited a chaotic situation around 1047/8, as his brother had become entangled in a conflict with the family of Giroie, and a revolt from his son Arnulf had overthrown him. Arnulf himself was soon murdered and Ivo, being the only remaining male in the direct line, assumed both the bishopric of Sées and the lordship of Bellême. He soon made peace with the Giroie, but faced a rebellion by the family of the Sorengi (Richard, Robert and Avesgot, sons of William Sorengi).  They seized the cathedral, but Ivo, with the help of Hugh de Grandmesnil, beat them back at the cost of badly damaging the cathedral in a fire. Yves repaired the roof, rededicating the building on Jan.2 of 1049, but the walls collapsed soon thereafter.  The construction of a new building was started soon, and by 1068 was advanced enough for Ivo to hold a synod, however it was not completed until 1126.  

After pacifying his Diocese, he went on a trip that took him first to the council of Rheims (October 1049), then to Apulia on a successful  fundraising campaign. From there, he went to Constantinople, where he received a relic of the true cross from the Emperor, presumably Constantine IX Monomachos. The date of his return is unclear, but usually given as 1053. 

In 1059, he invested Robert de Grandmesnil as abbot of Saint-Evroul.  In 1060, he gave his consent to the refoundation of the abbey of Saint-Martin de Sées by Roger de Montgomery, an event that indicates he was already close the political orbit or the Norman dukes, and could indicate he abandoned his traditional alliance with the Angevin counts. He was present in 1066 at the meeting where the invasion of England was discussed, but he neither participate nor lend support, as can be deduced from him not getting any English possession after the conquest.  

During his episcopate, he privileged peaceful relations with his neighbors, as can be appreciated from charter evidence linking him to  Rotrou I, Viscount of Châteaudun,  and his presence in the courts of the Norman dukes, Angevin counts and French kings. There was also a building program that included the beginning of a new cathedral and a motte in the south of the city. Moreover, two important monasteries were established during his pontificate (Saint Evroul and Almenêches), although without his initiative.

Orderic Vitalis, usually quite hostile to the House of Bellême, presents a very positive assessment of Ivo: learned and spiritual, shrewd, eloquent and peace-loving.   As a modern author has written, he was one of the last old-fashioned bishops, heavily involved in secular affairs, and in that respect close to Odo of Bayeux and Geoffrey de Montbray.

References

Sources 

1071 deaths
Bishops of Sées
11th-century French people